Karamusa can refer to:

 Karamusa, Çaycuma
 Karamusa, Çermik
 Karamusa, Şabanözü